In 1955  the state owned Ceylon Government Railway, now the Sri Lanka Railways, manufactured Sri Lanka's "first"  diesel-electric locomotive using old spares of withdrawn Class S1 DMU power sets. This locomotive was named as "Jayanthi" and classified Class M3 - 589. The locomotive was put to service on 5 September 1956. Two years later, in 1958, the then Ceylon Government Railway manufactured another locomotive and Classified it as Class M3 590.

The reconditioned Jayanthi was built at the Ratmalana Railway Workshop under the guidance of chief engineer, Mr. Raj Gopal. The locomotive made its maiden journey on 5 September 1956. The inauguration of the train was declared open by Maithreepala Senanayaka, Minister of Transportation, 1956 government. Currently, the locomotive is scrapped.

References

M03
5 ft 6 in gauge locomotives